David Joseph Schmidt (born April 22, 1957) is an American former Major League Baseball pitcher. He played for the Texas Rangers, Chicago White Sox, Baltimore Orioles, Montreal Expos, and Seattle Mariners between 1981 and 1992. Schmidt batted and threw right-handed. He is the pitching coordinator for the Orioles.

References

External links

1957 births
Living people
Major League Baseball pitchers
Texas Rangers players
Chicago White Sox players
Baltimore Orioles players
Montreal Expos players
Seattle Mariners players
Baseball players from Michigan
People from Niles, Michigan
Gulf Coast Rangers players
Asheville Tourists players
Tulsa Drillers players
Wichita Aeros players
Jacksonville Expos players
West Palm Beach Expos players
Oklahoma City 89ers players
Indianapolis Indians players
Tacoma Tigers players
Calgary Cannons players
UCLA Bruins baseball players
Baseball players from California
Sportspeople from Mission Viejo, California
American expatriate baseball players in Canada
Mat-Su Miners players